Näsviken may refer to:

 Näsviken, Hudiksvall Municipality, Sweden
 Näsvikens IK
 Näsviken, Strömsund Municipality, Sweden